This article details the complete oeuvre of American musician Jared Louche, including his work with The Aliens, Altered Statesmen, Chemlab, H3llb3nt, Peach of Immortality, Pigface, Progrex.iv and Vampire Rodents. In 1999 Louche released his debut solo album titled Covergirl on Fifth Colvmn Records.

Discography

Peach of Immortality

Studio albums

Video albums

Chemlab

Studio albums

Remix albums

Compilation albums

Extended plays

H3llb3nt

Studio albums

Compilation albums

proGREX.iv

Jared Louche and The Aliens

Prude

Altered Statesmen

Compilation albums

Credits

References

External links
Jared Louche at Discogs

Discographies of American artists
Rock music discographies